The  is the fourth largest river in Japan and the largest in the Tōhoku region. It flows through mostly rural areas of Iwate and Miyagi Prefectures. The source of the river is the Mount Nanashiruge in northern Iwate, from which it flows to the south between the Kitakami Mountains and the Ōu Mountains. The river is unusual in that it has two mouths, one flowing south into Ishinomaki Bay and the other flowing east into the Pacific Ocean, both in Ishinomaki City.

The Kitakami river was an important transportation route during the Edo period and before the building of railways in the early Meiji period. Numerous dams have been constructed on the river and its tributaries from the Taishō and Shōwa periods for hydroelectric power generation, flood control and irrigation. However, another unusual feature is that there are no dams from its mouth to the Shijūshida Dam north of Morioka. This allows for a spectacular salmon run every fall.

Tributaries 
In Iwate Prefecture from north to south showing from which direction the water flows and the city where it empties into the Kitakami River.
 Tanto-gawa - from the east (Iwate)
 Matsu-gawa - from the west (Hachimantai)
 Nakatsu River - from the east (Morioka)
 Shizukuishi River - from the west (Morioka)
 Iwasaki-gawa - from the west (Shiwa)
 Takina-gawa - from the west (Shiwa)
 Kuzumaru-gawa - from the west (Hanamaki)
 Hienuki-gawa - from the east (Hanamaki)
 Sarugaishi River - from the east (Hanamaki)
 Se-gawa - from the west (Hanamaki)
 Toyosawa-gawa - from the west (Hanamaki)
 Waga River - from the west (Kitakami)
 Isawa River - from the west (Ōshū)
 Hirose-gawa - from the east (Ōshū)
 Hitokabe-gawa - from the east (Ōshū)
 Koromo-gawa - from the west (Hiraizumi)
 Iwai-gawa - from the west (Ichinoseki)
 Kitetsu-gawa - from the north (Ichinoseki)
 Senmaya-gawa - from the east (Ichinoseki)
 Kinomi-gawa - from the east (Fujisawa)
 Kinryu-gawa - from the west (Ichinoseki)

See also

References

External links 

 (mouth)
 (former mouth)

Rivers of Iwate Prefecture
Rivers of Miyagi Prefecture
Iwate, Iwate
Takizawa, Iwate
Morioka, Iwate
Yahaba, Iwate
Shiwa, Iwate
Hanamaki, Iwate
Kitakami, Iwate
Kanegasaki, Iwate
Ōshū, Iwate
Hiraizumi, Iwate
Ichinoseki, Iwate
Tome, Miyagi
Ishinomaki
Rivers of Japan